Bowman County High School is a public high school located in Bowman, North Dakota. A part of Bowman County School District. As of 2007, it serves about 150 students. The athletic teams are known as the Bowman County Bulldogs. In 2006, Bowman High School combined with nearby Rhame High School to form the current Bowman County High School.

It serves Bowman and Rhame.

Athletics
In 2005 the number of wrestlers on the wrestling team was down to seven, making wrestling the most severely affected of the sports due to a population decline at the high school, which was among a trend of decline in rural North Dakota schools.

State championships
As Bowman High School:
Girls' cross country - 1979, 1980, 1981, 1982, 1983, 1984, 1985, 1986, 1987, 1988, 1989, 1990, 1992, 1993, 1994, 1995, 1996, 1997, 1998, 1999, 2000, 2001, 2003, 2004, 2005
Boys' cross country - 1909, 1980, 1981, 1982, 1983, 1984, 1987, 1989, 1990, 1992, 1993, 1994, 1995, 1999, 2000, 2020
Girls' track and field - 1977, 1978, 1979, 1980, 1982, 1990
Boys' track and field - 1976, 1977, 1978, 1991, 1993
Girls' Class B basketball - 1992

As Bowman County:
Girls' track and field - 2008

References

External links
Bowman County High School
North Dakota High School Activities Association page

Public high schools in North Dakota
Public middle schools in North Dakota
Schools in Bowman County, North Dakota
North Dakota High School Activities Association (Class B)
North Dakota High School Activities Association (Class AA Football)